The 1998 Skate America was the first event of six in the 1998–99 ISU Grand Prix of Figure Skating, a senior-level international invitational competition series. It was held at the Joe Louis Arena in Detroit, Michigan on October 29 – November 1. Medals were awarded in the disciplines of men's singles, ladies' singles, pair skating, and ice dancing. Skaters earned points toward qualifying for the 1998–99 Grand Prix Final.

Results

Men

Ladies

Pairs

Ice dancing

External links
 1998 Skate America

Skate America, 1998
Skate America